Lucien Grant Berry, Sr. (November 29, 1863 – December 31, 1937) was a brigadier general in the United States Army who served in three wars.

Early life
He was born on November 29, 1863 in Caton, New York to Samuel Spicer Berry and Olive Elizabeth Reed. He was appointed as a cadet at the United States Military Academy in West Point, New York on July 1, 1882. Berry graduated number nine of seventy-seven in the class of 1886. Several of his fellow classmates included men who would, like Berry himself, eventually rise to general officer rank, such as John J. Pershing, Charles T. Menoher, Walter Henry Gordon, Edward Mann Lewis, Mason Patrick, Julius Penn, Avery D. Andrews, John E. McMahon, Ernest Hinds, William H. Hay, James McRae, George B. Duncan and Jesse McI. Carter.

Personal life
He married Emily Ross Minier (1864-1945) on October 28, 1886. They had six children.

Military career
Berry was commissioned in the Fourth Artillery Brigade and served at Fort Preble, Maine; Fort Snelling, Minnesota, and Fort McPherson, Georgia. He graduated from the Artillery School at Fort Monroe, Virginia, and in 1892 he spent four years as an instructor at the United States Military Academy. He was in the Puerto Rican Expedition in 1898, then was sent to Fort Slocum, New York, and Fort Adams, Rhode Island.

In 1900, he was on the China Relief Expedition, became a captain, and was sent to the Philippines. Upon his return to the United States, Berry commanded the 21st Battery Field Artillery at Fort Sheridan, Illinois. He was then sent to the School of Fire at Fort Sill, Oklahoma, and in 1907 was promoted to major.

For three years, he commanded a battalion of the Third Field Artillery Brigade at Fort Sam, Texas. On March 11, 1911, Berry was promoted to lieutenant colonel and went to the Army War College, graduating in 1912. He then commanded the Third Field Artillery Brigade at Fort D. A. Russel, Wyoming until 1913, when he was promoted to colonel and given command of the Fourth Mountain Field Artillery Brigade. He took this brigade to Vera Cruz, Mexico in 1914 and then onto the Mexican Punitive Expedition in 1916 and 1917. On August 5, 1917, Berry was promoted to brigadier general and commanded the 60th Field Artillery Brigade in Oklahoma. In May 1918, he took this brigade to France and joined the 35th Infantry Division in the Vosges Mountains. He was the 35th Division's Chief of Artillery and also supported the First Infantry Division in battle. He returned to the States in April 1919, and on June 5 reverted to his permanent rank of colonel. He commanded the 78th Field Artillery Brigade and later the Sixth Field Artillery Brigade until his retirement on June 19, 1921. While retired, he was promoted to brigadier general in 1930.

Death and legacy
He died at the age of seventy-four on December 31, 1937, in Corning, New York. He was buried at Arlington National Cemetery.

References

Bibliography
Davis, Henry Blaine. Generals in Khaki. Raleigh, NC: Pentland Press, 1998.

External links
 Lucien Grant Berry photograph collection at the U.S. Army Heritage and Education Center
 Lucien Grant Berry at Arlington National Cemetery

1863 births
1938 deaths
United States Army generals
Burials at Arlington National Cemetery
United States Military Academy alumni
People from Steuben County, New York
United States Army generals of World War I
Military personnel from New York (state)